Sydney Uni Baseball Club (SUBC) is an Australian baseball club that was established in , making it one of the oldest clubs in Australia.

Sydney Uni Baseball Club is a part of Sydney University Sport and Fitness, an organisation whose history dates back to 1852. Sydney Uni Sport & Fitness has produced more Australian representatives and won more major competitions than any other club.

SUBC enters three teams in the Sydney Winter Baseball League, which is the highest calibre competition in the state for the winter season. The club also enters a fourth team into the Pacific Coast Baseball League.

The History of Sydney Uni Baseball Club

Foundation years

Details of the club's first game are not known, but the second game was played against Waverley, formed in 1898. The Club was formed to give cricketers who did not play football or row a way to keep fit in the winter months. The first President was the registrar H.E. Barff, secretary was Dr J.S. Harris, the prime mover in the formation of the club, and treasurer was G.T. Balcombe.

In the inaugural season, the team was entered in the second grade of NSW Baseball Association (NSWBA), and won 10 from 12 games. The club played home games on Rushcutters Bay Oval, and trained twice a week on The Square, where the club still trains today 105 years later.

In 1907 A.D. Watson was selected to represent Australia against the representatives of the American Fleet. In 1911 F.E. McElhone, A.D. Watson and C.V. Single represented NSW in all three games against Victoria, while R. Campling and F.M. Farrar represented NSW against Tasmania.

While most other clubs in the University suspended participation in competitions during World War I, the baseball club was an exception and continued playing. In fact in 1916, playing its home games on the University Oval, the club won its first championship by winning the first grade district championship and hence the Proud Shield, by defeating Petersham 12-7 in the final.

1920s
1923 proved to be an important year for the Club for two reasons. First, the club played its first inter-varsity match, sending a team to play Adelaide University and secondly, it was the first time since its inception that the Club fielded three teams in the NSWBA. In 1926 there was a triangular series held between Sydney, Adelaide and Melbourne universities. Sydney took out the series undefeated and managed to do the same the following year.

In 1927, Jack Mould - the first grade captain at the time, who the Club MVP trophy is now named after - was chosen to captain NSW. He has a Blue for baseball, and was later patron of the club from 1941 to 1983. Mould was associated with the Club for over 60 years as a player, administrator and coach.

In 1928 Sydney Uni engaged in the first international University match in Australia, playing Stanford University. The tourists defeated Sydney 5-2. Stanford then played a combined Sydney, Melbourne and Adelaide team, comprehensively defeating the Australians 31-6.

1950s and 1960s
Also in 1962 Jeffrey, A. Alderson and F. Hampshire were selected to compete for NSW in the Claxton Shield in Perth. In 1966 one of the highlights for the club was the inter-varsity held in Sydney. Seven universities contested, with all games being played on the two ovals. Sydney took out the title undefeated to take the Hugh J. Ward Cup for the first time since 1957.

1970s
In fact, 1973 proved to be probably the most successful season to date. Under the presidency of Alan Compton, the Club won both the first grade premiership and intervarsity. Overall the club was first grade premier, first grade pennant winner (minor premiers), joint club champion (with Mosman) and intervarsity Champion, while Ian Anderson received the Fred Bachall trophy for NSW 'player of the year' for the second straight year. Ron Finlay, the former chairman of the Australian Baseball Federation, was declared MVP for the intervarsity tournament. Neil Barrowcliff was another notable representative player from the era.

Modern era

University Games

Since its inception in 1993, the Australian University Games have been popular. Sydney University sport has long been the premier Sporting University in the country, and has won eight overall titles, and until 2008 remained the only University to win the title away from home, in Perth 2004.

2006 proved to be the most successful year for the baseball team. On the back of a lot of new blood in the team featuring players such as Scholarship holders Jonathon Freeston and Stephen Smith, Sydney Uni won the Eastern Uni Games, defeating University of New South Wales by mercy rule in the final, to pick up Sydney Uni Baseball's first gold in Uni Games history. The team then headed to Adelaide for the Australian Games and went through the competition undefeated, with an emphatic win over Monash in the final, to be crowned National Champions for the first time.

The Cynics continued their Uni Games dominance over the next few years, with a silver medal in 2008, and added another gold to the collection in 2009, with an 8-5 win over Griffith University. This cemented Sydney Uni's position as the champion University team in the country, with three gold and a silver in the past four years. Pictured right is also the 84-year-old trophy that Uni Games Baseball teams compete for each year. The trophy was originally awarded to the combined University team that played against the touring American Army Team in 1925, after sweeping the tourists in a best of three series. It has since been awarded annually to the Inter Varsity/Uni Games champion since the early 1940s.

Sydney Uni Baseball Club Awards
The Club MVP award speaks for itself, recognising the most valuable player in the club, who is usually always the 1st grade MVP also. The award is named after Jack Mould who was associated with the Club for over 60 years as a player, administrator and coach. In 1927 Mould was chosen to captain NSW. He has a Blue for baseball, and was patron of the club from 1941 to 1983.

The Stump Award is awarded annually to the individual who has displayed the greatest spirited performance to the club over the course of the year, which is basically the best and fairest. The stump is actually a part of the tree that hangs over first base and was donated by  Pam Garrett, mother of Phil Garret, who one of the best players of the club during the 1980s and 1990s, and a utility on the best Cynics team from 1971 to 2004.

The Jennie Finlay Encouragement Award is traditionally awarded to a first or second year student of The University of Sydney as a 'rookie of the year' type of award. Jenny Finlay is the wife of club stalwart Ron Finlay who was a long-standing player, president and patron of the baseball club.

The David Hynes Club Batting Champion Award was introduced in 2009, in honour of the baseball achievements and long term support of the Club by David Hynes. David was the recipient of the very first scholarship awarded by the Sydney Uni Sport Union back in the early 1990s. David went on to represent Australia at the 1996 Atlanta Olympics where he posted the second highest batting in the tournament. David is also a Sponsor of the Ron Rushbrooke Foundation and has long been a supporter of both the Club and Sydney Uni Sport. David is also the starting first basemen in the Sydney Uni team of the century and currently the Chairman of Baseball Australia.

The Neil Barrowcliff Gold Glove Award was also introduced in 2009 to commemorate the career of former state and Australian representative Neil Barrowcliff. Neil played 12 seasons for NSW at Claxton Shield level and represented Australia on 3 occasions. Neil was selected in the Sydney Uni team of the century as a starting outfielder and was the guest speaker at our centenary dinner back in 2004.

Scholarships

Sydney Uni Baseball Club offers opportunities which are simply not available at the majority of other clubs in Sydney Baseball. Students of The University of Sydney open themselves to the opportunity to apply for scholarships, while representing the Club.

Students who are accepted into The University of Sydney and play baseball for Sydney Uni Baseball Club are assisted in their application for Elite Athlete Scholarships.

Elite Athlete Scholarship

Sydney Uni Sport and Fitness Scholarship holders are eligible to receive Financial Assistance which may range from $1,000 to $10,000 per annum, Representative Travel Grants of up to $2000, Personal Development, Tutoring, Academic Representation and Liaison, Academic Counselling, Media Exposure, Facility Access, Sport Services and the Elite Athlete and Performers Scheme.

Talented Athlete Program (TAP)
Awarded to those athletes with recognised potential. Benefits, as outlined above, include; Personal Development, Tutoring Academic, Representation and Liaison, Academic Counselling, Media Exposure, Facility Access, Sport Services, Athlete Mentoring.

Ron Rushbrooke Scholarship

The Ron Rushbrooke Scholarship Fund originated as a bequest from Mr Rushbrooke in 2004. The Fund is a vehicle to ensure the perpetual viability of Varsity baseball, with the aim to raise the invested principal to a level sufficient to cover the Club's expected regular season liabilities, and the perpetual scholarship, from the flow of Fund investment income.

The Ron Rushbrooke Scholarship is available to students of The University, who may not meet all selection criteria for the Elite Athlete Scholarship, as set out by SUSF, yet still prove to be a great asset to the Club, through both on field play, and off field contributions.

References

External links
 Sydney Uni Baseball Club
 Sydney Winter Baseball League
 Pacific Coast Baseball League

1904 establishments in Australia
Baseball teams established in 1904
Sports clubs established in 1904
Australian baseball clubs
Base
Sporting clubs in Sydney
University and college sports clubs in Australia